known as , also written Dokonjyonosuke Mishima, is a Japanese mixed martial artist and professional wrestler. He has competed professionally since 1998 in organizations such as Shooto, DEEP, PRIDE, the UFC and in his pro wrestling days he has competed in Kiyoshi Tamura's organization U-Style Pro Wrestling.

Mishima is known for his charisma and emphasis on entertainment as well as competition. He typically enters the arena in an outlandish fashion, such as in his UFC debut, where he sported a bathrobe and devil mask while clutching a Snoopy stuffed animal.

Career 
On December 14, 2002, Mishima challenged Takanori Gomi for the Shooto welterweight (154 lb) championship, but lost by technical knockout due to punches.

On February 12, 2005, Mishima was victorious against fellow DEEP veteran Tomomi Iwama becoming the first lightweight (155 lb) champion of the organisation. However, Mishima didn't defend his belt and returned it one year later.

Mishima had four fights in PRIDE, winning over Charles Bennett and Marcus Aurélio and losing to Yves Edwards and Ralph Gracie.  His final appearance with the company was in the reserve fight of PRIDE Bushido 9 on September 25, 2005, where he defeated fellow alternate Charles Bennett with an ankle lock.

On November 18, 2006, Mishima made his debut in the U.S. at UFC 65.  Joe Stevenson, the winner of The Ultimate Fighter 2 who had just moved down to the lightweight division (155 lb), defeated Mishima in the first round by a guillotine choke.

Mishima's fought Kenny Florian at UFC Fight Night 9 on April 5, 2007, in Las Vegas. Mishima lost to a rear naked choke, shortly after attempting to submit Florian with a knee bar.

On May 19, 2008, Mishima dropped to featherweight (145 lb) to fight Masakazu Imanari. Mishima won by unanimous decision, becoming the DEEP featherweight champion. He also became the first man to capture the DEEP belt in two different divisions.

Championships and accomplishments
DEEP
Deep Lightweight Championship (1 Time, First)
Deep Featherweight Championship (1 Time)
Ultimate Fighting Championship
Fight of the Night (1 Time)

Mixed martial arts record 

|-
| Win
| align=center| 21–7–2
| Takeshi Yamazaki
| Decision (unanimous)
| Grabaka Live - 1st Cage Attack
| 
| align=center| 2
| align=center| 5:00
| Tokyo, Japan
| 
|-
| Loss
| align=center| 20–7–2
| Takafumi Otsuka
| Decision (unanimous)
| Deep: 43 Impact
| 
| align=center| 3
| align=center| 5:00
| Tokyo, Japan
| 
|-
| Win
| align=center| 20–6–2
| Toshiaki Kitada
| TKO (punches)
| Deep: Protect Impact 2008
| 
| align=center| 2
| align=center| 2:51
| Tokyo, Japan
| 
|-
| Win
| align=center| 19–6–2
| Masakazu Imanari
| Decision (unanimous)
| Deep: 35 Impact
| 
| align=center| 3
| align=center| 5:00
| Tokyo, Japan
| 
|-
| Loss
| align=center| 18–6–2
| Kenny Florian
| Technical Submission (rear naked choke)
| UFC Fight Night: Stevenson vs. Guillard
| 
| align=center| 3
| align=center| 3:57
| Las Vegas, Nevada, United States
| 
|-
| Loss
| align=center| 
| Joe Stevenson
| Submission (guillotine choke)
| UFC 65: Bad Intentions
| 
| align=center| 1
| align=center| 2:07
| Sacramento, California, United States
| 
|-
| Win
| align=center| 18–4–2
| Charles Bennett
| Submission (ankle lock)
| Pride: Bushido 9
| 
| align=center| 1
| align=center| 4:04
| Tokyo, Japan
| 
|-
| Loss
| align=center| 17–4–2
| Yves Edwards
| Submission (armbar)
| Pride: Bushido 7
| 
| align=center| 1
| align=center| 4:36
| Tokyo, Japan
| 
|-
| Win
| align=center| 17–3–2
| Tomomi Iwama
| Decision (unanimous)
| Deep: 18th Impact
| 
| align=center| 3
| align=center| 5:00
| Tokyo, Japan
| 
|-
| Win
| align=center| 16–3–2
| Marcus Aurélio
| Decision (split)
| PRIDE Bushido 4
| 
| align=center| 2
| align=center| 5:00
| Nagoya, Japan
| 
|-
| Win
| align=center| 15–3–2
| Rob Emerson
| Decision (unanimous)
| Deep: 14th Impact
| 
| align=center| 3
| align=center| 5:00
| Osaka, Japan
| 
|-
| Loss
| align=center| 14–3–2
| Ralph Gracie
| Decision (unanimous)
| PRIDE Bushido 1
| 
| align=center| 2
| align=center| 5:00
| Saitama, Japan
| 
|-
| Win
| align=center| 14–2–2
| Tetsuji Kato
| Decision (majority)
| Deep - 12th Impact
| 
| align=center| 3
| align=center| 5:00
| Tokyo, Japan
| 
|-
| Win
| align=center| 13–2–2
| Masakazu Imanari
| TKO (punches)
| Deep - 11th Impact
| 
| align=center| 2
| align=center| 2:58
| Osaka, Japan
| 
|-
| Win
| align=center| 12–2–2
| Fábio Mello
| Decision (unanimous)
| Deep - 8th Impact
| 
| align=center| 3
| align=center| 5:00
| Tokyo, Japan
| 
|-
| Loss
| align=center| 11–2–2
| Takanori Gomi
| TKO (punches)
| Shooto - Year End Show 2002
| 
| align=center| 2
| align=center| 0:52
| Tokyo, Japan
| 
|-
| Win
| align=center| 11–1–2
| Takafumi Ito
| Submission (armbar)
| Deep - 6th Impact
| 
| align=center| 1
| align=center| 0:53
| Tokyo, Japan
| 
|-
| Win
| align=center| 10–1–2
| Iran Mascarenhas
| Submission (achilles lock)
| Shooto - Treasure Hunt 7
| 
| align=center| 2
| align=center| 4:53
| Osaka, Japan
| 
|-
| Win
| align=center| 9–1–2
| Masao Ando
| Submission (triangle choke)
| Pancrase - Spirit 4
| 
| align=center| 2
| align=center| 2:22
| Osaka, Japan
|
|-
| Win
| align=center| 8–1–2
| Ben Thomas
| TKO (punches)
| Shooto - Treasure Hunt 3
| 
| align=center| 1
| align=center| 3:07
| Kobe, Japan
| 
|-
| Win
| align=center| 7–1–2
| Ryan Bow
| Decision (majority)
| Shooto – To The Top Final Act
| 
| align=center| 3
| align=center| 5:00
| Tokyo, Japan
| 
|-
| Win
| align=center| 6–1–2
| Marcio Barbosa
| Submission (kneebar)
| Shooto – R.E.A.D. Final
| 
| align=center| 2
| align=center| 4:51
| Tokyo, Japan
| 
|-
| Win
| align=center| 5–1–2
| Tony DeDolph
| Submission (armbar)
| HOOKnSHOOT – Fusion
| 
| align=center| 1
| align=center| 4:53
| Indiana, United States
| 
|-
| Draw
| align=center| 4–1–2
| Marcio Feitosa
| Draw
| Shooto – R.E.A.D. 9
| 
| align=center| 3
| align=center| 5:00
| Yokohama, Japan
| 
|-
| Win
| align=center| 4–1–1
| Justin Wisniewski
| Submission (cobra hold)
| Shooto – R.E.A.D. 8
| 
| align=center| 1
| align=center| 1:30
| Osaka, Japan
| 
|-
| Loss
| align=center| 3–1–1
| Din Thomas
| TKO (cut)
| Shooto – R.E.A.D. 2
| 
| align=center| 2
| align=center| 3:37
| Tokyo, Japan
| 
|-
| Win
| align=center| 3–0–1
| Kazuya Abe
| Decision (unanimous)
| Shooto - Renaxis 5
| 
| align=center| 2
| align=center| 5:00
| Osaka, Japan
| 
|-
| Win
| align=center| 2–0–1
| Makoto Ishikawa
| Decision (unanimous)
| Shooto - Renaxis 3
| 
| align=center| 2
| align=center| 5:00
| Tokyo, Japan
| 
|-
| Win
| align=center| 1–0–1
| Hiroki Kotani
| Submission (rear naked choke)
| Shooto - Shooter's Passion
| 
| align=center| 1
| align=center| 4:00
| Tokyo, Japan
| 
|-
| Draw
| align=center| 0–0–1
| Satoshi Fujisaki
| Draw
| Shooto - Las Grandes Viajes 1
| 
| align=center| 2
| align=center| 5:00
| Tokyo, Japan
|

See also 
 List of male mixed martial artists

References

External links 
 
 
 PRIDE profile

1972 births
Living people
People from Amagasaki
Japanese male mixed martial artists
Featherweight mixed martial artists
Mixed martial artists utilizing judo
Mixed martial artists utilizing taekwondo
Japanese male judoka
Japanese male taekwondo practitioners
Sportspeople from Amagasaki
Sportspeople from Hyōgo Prefecture
Deep (mixed martial arts) champions
Ultimate Fighting Championship male fighters